Ajmal Sultanpuri (1923 – 29 January 2020) was an Indian poet in Urdu language. He was a native of Harakhpur in Sultanpur District, Uttar Pradesh. In 1967, He was beaten by few village men because he was trying to protest against social discrimination. After that, he moved to Sultanpur and never went back to Harakhpur.

He was awarded the Lifetime Achievement Award by Uttar Pradesh Urdu Academy in March 2016, for his contribution to Urdu poetry.

Kahan hai mera Hindustan and Mai tera Shahjahan are two of his popular poems, which he recited at mushairas (poetry recitals). His poetry was based on his hardships during his lifetime as well as on communal harmony and multiculturalism of India. His most famous poem is below He was admitted to Karunashray Hospital on 6 January 2020 due to poor health. He went into coma and died on 29 January 2020 at the age of 97.

Notable poems
(in Devanagari script):

‘मुस्लमां और हिंदू की जान
कहां है मेरा हिन्दुस्तान
मैं उसको ढूढ़ रहा हूं...

मेरे बचपन का हिन्दुस्तान
न बंगलादेश न पाकिस्तान
मेरी आशा मेरा अरमान
वो पूरा पूरा हिन्दुस्तान
मैं उसको ढूढ़ रहा हूं...

वो मेरा बचपन वो स्कूल
वो कच्ची सड़कें उड़ती धूल
लहकते बाग महकते फूल
वो मेरा खेत मेरा खलिहान
मैं उसको ढूढ़ रहा हूं
मुसलमां और हिंदू की जान...

वो उर्दू गजले हिन्दी गीत
कहीं वो प्यार कहीं वो प्रीत
पहाड़ी झरनों के संगीत
दिहाती लहरा पूर्वी तान
मैं उसको ढूढ़ रहा हूं...

जहां के कृष्ण जहां के राम
जहां की श्याम सलोनी शाम
जहां की सुबह बनारस धाम
जहां भगवान करैं स्नान
मैं उसको ढूढ़ रहा हूं
मुसलमां और हिन्दू की जान..

कहा हैं मेरा हिन्दुस्तान
जहां थे तुलसी और कबीर
जायसी जैसे पीर फकीर
जहां थे मोमीन गालिब मीर
जहां थे रहमन और रसखान
मैं उसको ढूढ़ रहा हूं...
मुसलमां और हिन्दू की जान ...

वो मेरे पुरखों की जागीर
कराची, लाहौर वो कश्मीर
वो बिलकुल शेर की सी तस्वीर
वो पूरा पूरा हिन्दुस्तान
मैं उसको ढ़़ूढ़ रहा हूं ...

जहां की पाक पवित्र जमीन
जहां की मिट्टी फुर्त नसीन
जहां महराज मोइनुद्दीन
गरीब नवाज हिन्दुस्तान
मैं उसको ढूढ़ रहा हूं
मुसलमां और हिन्दू की जान
कहा हैं मेरा हिन्दुस्तान
मैं उसको ढूढ़ रहा हूं...

ये भूखा शायर प्यासा कवि
सिसकता चांद सुलगता रवि
वो जिस मुद्रा ऐसी छवि
करादे अजमल को जलपान
मैं उसको ढूढ़ रहा हूं ...

मेरे बचपन का हिन्दुस्तान
न बांग्लादेश न पाकिस्तान
वो पूरा पूरा हिन्दुस्तान
मैं उसको ढूढ़ रहा हूं।'

References

1923 births
2020 deaths
Urdu-language poets from India
Poets from Uttar Pradesh
Indian male poets
Indian Muslims
20th-century Indian poets
20th-century Indian male writers
People from Sultanpur, Uttar Pradesh